Maaya Rambha is a 1950 Indian Telugu-language Hindu mythological film, produced and directed by T. P. Sundaram under the N. B. Productions banner. It stars N. T. Rama Rao and Anjali Devi, with music composed by Ogirala Ramachandra Rao. The film was dubbed in Tamil.

Plot 
Narada smells food for himself in Rambha's endeavour to pollute the fervent penance of a Rushi and pricks her vanity, which ultimately results in the latter's expressions of her unique beauty and his challenge thereof. The opportunities that present themselves are many for Narada to insult Rambha in Lord Krishna's Birthday Durbar. When he crowns Kalavathy, the Lord Court dancer and his disciple with the honor of a dance recital pair up with Vidhyadhara, another student of his, ignoring the claims of Kalavathy and Nalacoobara. The Lord presents a Manikyamala jointly to Kalavathy and Vjdhyadhara's claims, which the latter reject when offered by the former.

Now Vidhyadhara and Nalacoobara remain at Dwaraka the former with his Guru and later forced by his love for Kalavathi. Kambha is hurt on both sides and she too stays there to mend her husband Kalavathy methodically reveals to Vidhyadhara her heart which has been reserved for him since their very first meeting and Vidhya learns to love, often they meet in the garden of Narada Ashram. On one such occasion, Nala watches their intimacy in the form of a deer and becomes restless. The more Rambha tries to control him, the more obstinate he turns. He visits Kala's house and offers his all for her love, but in vain. Then he meets Kala in the garden in the form of Vidhyadhara, for whom she is waiting and appearing as Nala to Vidhyadhara who, having been engaged in taking Bhagavath Geetha from Lord Krishna, comes there late, makes him misunderstand that he (Nala) is the one who is loved by Kala; with this stroke, Vidhya takes leave of his Guru to be away from Dwaraka and away from all that is feminine in the world. The innocent Kala goes out alone in search of him, not knowing her crime is absent, and Uddanda, her maid's husband starts in search of her.

Nala, in his pursuit of Kalavathy, finds her in the forest and tries to molest her, diverting the path of Uddanda who approaches the spot, by creating a Yakshini when Rambha appears on the scene and Kala slips off, Narada comes there and informs Rambha of Indra's curse on her, whereby she is deprived of her divine powers, for neglecting her duty. Rambha mistakes Kala for reciprocating Nala's love and decides to do away with her life. Uddanda, for his misbehavior with a Parkaya Yogi, is cursed by him to be a dove. Kalavathy, while searching for Vidhyadhara, is caught in a storm and finally loses his eyesight. Vidhya, who by now has almost completed his visits to temples, meets Kala's innocence is spoiled by yet another treacherous act of Nalacoobra, who gains Kala's sympathy in the form of a baby and creates the motherly atmosphere about her, on seeing which, Vidyadhara confirms her infidelity and goes away without speaking to the blind one. Taking his original form out of the baby, Nala again tries to molest Kalavathy, when earthly Kalpaka defends her, lowering Nala's caste. But the trials and tribulations of Kala who, though blind, throws off Kalpavalli's shelter and proceeds in search of Vidhya only to know her crime and die, never appear to end. Rambha, from behind the idol of Bhubaneswar Temple instigates Kalpalika, a staunch devotee of Goddess and aspirant of Amrajyasiddi to sacrifice Kalavathy at the altar of the Goddess to gain his ends when he is out to sacrifice himself for the purpose. So Kalavathy now falls from the frying pan into the fire of merciless Kapalika's hands, who takes her to the altar under the pretext of showing her husband, and notwithstanding the appeal of the old Kapalani there, raises his sword which, while measuring its distance from Kala's neck clashes with another

Cast 
N. T. Rama Rao as Nalakubharudu
Anjali Devi as Kalavathi
G. Varalakshmi as Rambha
C. S. R. as Narada Maharshi
Kasturi Siva Rao as Udhanda
K. Raghuramayya as Vidyadhara
Balijepalli Lakshmikantam as Kapalika
Kumpatla as Thota Maali
K. V. Srinivas as Krishna
A. L. Narayana as Parakaaya Yogi
Sriranjani as Adavi Pilla
Surabhi Kamalabai as Kapalini
Soudamini as Kalavathi's friend
Jayalakshmi as Vasanthi
Revathi as Yakshini

Reception 
A reviewer for Zamin Ryot praised the performances of the cast especially Anjali Devi, N. T. Rama Rao, and Siva Rao but criticised the direction and technical aspects like photography, sound, and production design.

References

External links 
 

1950s musical drama films
1950s Telugu-language films
Films directed by T. R. Sundaram
Hindu mythological films
Indian black-and-white films
Indian musical drama films